Kilimanjaro: How to Spell Love, a Swiss romantic TV Movie Comedy, was produced in 2001 by Schweizer Fernsehen & Triluna Film. Distributed by Telepool in Switzerland, Germany and Austria. Written by Jürgen Ladenburger, directed by Mike Eschmann.

Cast
The cast includes Martin Rapold, Gesine Crukowski, Stefan Gubser, Inigo Gallo, and Eliane Chappuis.

Plot
The animal trainer Roberto, who cannot read or write, accidentally gets into a literature TV-Talk Show, while looking for his runaway Chimpanzee. There he also meet his surprised love "Juliette" again, a single mother and very attractive editor in chief.

External links
Film production Company Triluna Film (Switzerland)
"Kilimanjaro, How to spell Love" Swiss Films (Switzerland)

References

2001 films
Swiss romantic comedy films
2000s German-language films